The 2016–17 The Citadel Bulldogs basketball team represented The Citadel, The Military College of South Carolina in the 2016–17 NCAA Division I men's basketball season. The Bulldogs were led by second-year head coach Duggar Baucom and played their home games at McAlister Field House in Charleston, South Carolina. They played as a member of the Southern Conference, as they have since 1936–37. They finished the season 12–21, 4–14 in SoCon play to finish in a tie for eighth place. They defeated Western Carolina in the first round of the SoCon tournament to advance to the quarterfinals where they lost to UNC Greensboro.

Previous season 
The Bulldogs finished the 2015–16 season 10–22, 3–15 in SoCon play to finish in last place. They lost in the first round of the SoCon tournament to Mercer.

Preseason

Departures
Several players departed the program, 2 due to graduation, 2 more as graduate students completing their eligibility, and 2 to transfer.

Recruiting
With many departures, The Citadel added 10 new players for the 2016–17 season.  This marks another step in moving from a slow pace to the Baucom-led uptempo style of play.  At least one player changed his plans as a result of a photo that surfaced on social media which showed cadets dressed as ghosts, but widely interpreted as similar to Ku Klux Klan garb.

Roster

Schedule and results
The Citadel travelled to play opponents in the Pac-12, Big 12, and ACC, and host an exempt tournament to be known as the Holy City Hoops Classic.

|-
! colspan=8 style=|Exhibition

|-
! colspan=8 style=|Non-conference regular season

|-
! colspan=8 style=|SoCon regular season

|-
! colspan=8 style=|SoCon tournament

References

The Citadel Bulldogs basketball seasons
Citadel
Citadel
Citadel